USS Grampus (SS-4), a Plunger-class submarine later named A-3, was the fourth ship of the United States Navy to be named for a member of the dolphin family, Grampus griseus.

Her keel was laid down on 10 December 1900 at San Francisco, California, by Union Iron Works, a subcontractor for the Holland Torpedo Boat Company of New York City. She was launched on 31 July 1902 sponsored by Mrs. Marley F. Hay, wife of the Superintendent of Construction at Union Iron Works. She was tested at the Holland Torpedo Boat Station.

Her christening was marred by a failure of the ribbon from which the champagne was hung, leading some sailors to believe she was cursed.

The boat was commissioned at the Mare Island Navy Yard on 28 May 1903 with Lieutenant Arthur MacArthur III (brother of General Douglas MacArthur) in command.

Over the next three and a half years, Grampus operated out of the San Francisco, California, area, principally in training and experimental work. On 18 April 1906, men from her crew participated in relief efforts after the devastating San Francisco earthquake of 1906. Decommissioned at Mare Island on 28 November, Grampus remained inactive until recommissioned on 13 June 1908. Subsequently assigned to the First Submarine Division, Pacific Torpedo Flotilla, in January 1910, and to the Pacific Fleet in March 1911, the submarine torpedo boat operated locally off the California coast until assigned to the Pacific Reserve Fleet on 28 June 1912. Toward the end of her active service, on 17 November 1911, Grampus was renamed A-3.

A-3 remained inactive, at the Puget Sound Navy Yard into 1915. On 16 February 1915, she was hoisted onto the collier , which sailed soon thereafter for the Philippines with A-3 and her sister ship, A-5 (ex-), as deck cargo. Hector arrived at Olongapo, site of the Subic Bay Naval Base, on 26 March, and returned A-3 to the water 10 April.

Commissioned at Olongapo a week later, on 17 April, A-3 was assigned to the First Submarine Division, Torpedo Flotilla, Asiatic Fleet, and remained in active service with that unit until decommissioned at Cavite on 25 July 1921. During World War I, A-3 patrolled the waters off the entrance to Manila Bay. On 17 July 1920, A-3 was given the hull number SS-4.

Dismantled and used as a target by ships of the Asiatic Fleet, A-3 was stricken from the Naval Vessel Register on 16 January 1922.

Notes

Bibliography

 

Grampus 004
World War I submarines of the United States
1906 San Francisco earthquake
Ships built in San Francisco
1902 ships
Ships sunk as targets
Ships built by Union Iron Works